The 1955 Tour was the second concert tour by British pop singer-songwriter Mika in support of his second studio album The Boy Who Knew Too Much. The tour spanned across North America, Australia and the Far East.

In February 2010 Mika launched another tour, the Imaginarium Tour which started in Belfast, Northern Ireland and took him throughout Europe and back to Asia.

Background
Mika announced the official name of his tour on 4 October 2009 while in rehearsals for the North American leg. The tour had an outer space theme.

The idea behind this tour was that a civilian sent into space became lost after something went terribly wrong with the mission. When the show started, attendees learned that the civilian-turned-astronaut lost in space was Mika.

The shows opened with the band in a living room-like setting, watching a fake news report on TV. Actor Ian McKellen served as the narrator for this fake news show. Large styrofoam balls painted to look like planets (some painted by fans) were suspended from the ceiling around the set. Mika usually came onstage from a higher place dressed like an astronaut. He gradually came to the floor, took off the space suit, then changed into a black & white suit. The band for this tour was usually backing singer iMMa, drummer Cherisse Ofusu-Osei, keyboardist David Whitmey, bass player Jimmy Sims, and guitarist Martin Waugh, and they usually wore black & white or neon costumes. On the North American leg of the tour the opening act was Gary Go.

Setlist

Tour dates

External links
 Official tour website

References

Mika (singer) concert tours
2009 concert tours